The Primera División de Fútbol Profesional Clausura 2003 season (officially "Torneo Apertura 2002") started on January 21, 2003.

The season was composed of the following clubs:

 C.D. FAS
 Municipal Limeño
 San Salvador F.C.
 C.D. Águila
 C.D. Luis AngelFirpo
 A.D. Isidro Metapán
 C.D. Atlético Balboa
 Alianza F.C.
 C.D. Arcense
 C.D. Dragón

Team information

Personnel and sponsoring

Managerial changes

Before the season

During the season

Clausura 2002 standings
Last updated August 3, 2002

Semifinals 1st Leg

Semifinals 2nd Leg

Final

List of foreign players in the league
This is a list of foreign players in Clausura 2003. The following players:
have played at least one apetura game for the respective club.
have not been capped for the El Salvador national football team on any level, independently from the birthplace

C.D. Águila
  Andre Luiz Vieira
  Alexander Prediguer
  Marcio Sampaio
  Darío Larrosa
  Luis Almada

Alianza F.C.
  Diego De Rosa
  Gustavo Fuentes
  Elvis Scott
  Abel Rodríguez
  Luis Espindola

Atletico Balboa
  Luis Carlos Asprilla
  Juan Carlos Mosquera
  Santiago Rodríguez
  Ernesto Aquino
  Camilo Bonilla
  Enzo Calderon

Arcense
  John Polo
  Nito Gonzales
  Libardo Carvajal
  Gerson Mier

Dragon
   Ducivan De Sousa
  John Elder Castillo
  Eduardo Arriola
  Alberto Guity
  Joshua Vaca

 (player released mid season)
  (player Injured mid season)
 Injury replacement player

C.D. FAS
  Alejandro Bentos 
  Walter Escobar
  Victor Hugo Mafla
  Williams Reyes
  Pedro Prado

C.D. Luis Ángel Firpo
  Paulo César Rodrigues Lima
  Henry Sevillano
  Juan Pablo Chacón
  Gustavo Cabrera
  Frank Palomino

A.D. Isidro Metapán
  Diego Alvarez
  Wilson Sanchez
  Marvin Orlando Brown
  Noel Flores
  Jorge Wagner

Municipal Limeno
  Marcelo Marquez
  Jorge Sandoval
  Fabian Andres Perez
  César Charún
  Aldo Cavero

San Salvador F.C.
  Rodrigo Lagos
  Emiliano Pedrozo
  Alexander Obregon
  Orlando Garces
  Franklin Webster

External links

Primera División de Fútbol Profesional Clausura seasons
El
1